Clark International Speedway, abbreviated as CIS, is a motorsport venue at the Clark Freeport Zone in Mabalacat, Pampanga, Philippines.

It was built on November 15, 2008 and has a Grade 4 accreditation level from the FIA. The  circuit features 18 turns and runs in a counter-clockwise direction. Clark International Speedway hosts both 2- and 4-wheeled events. This includes the Philippine Superbike Championship, Toyota Vios Cup, Philippine GT Championship, Philippine Touring Car Championship, and FlatOut Race Series. The layout also has a  drag strip that hosts the National Drag Racing Championship.

The circuit hosted the second event of the 2016–17 Formula 4 South East Asia Championship. This was the first event in the motorsport venue to be certified by the Fédération Internationale de l'Automobile.

External links 
Circuit Map and info

References

Motorsport venues in the Philippines
Buildings and structures in Mabalacat
Sports in Pampanga